This is a list of the bird species recorded in Palau. The avifauna of Palau include a total of 186 species, of which 12 are endemic, and 5 have been introduced by humans. 9 species are globally threatened.

This list's taxonomic treatment (designation and sequence of orders, families and species) and nomenclature (common and scientific names) follow the conventions of The Clements Checklist of Birds of the World, 2022 edition. The family accounts at the beginning of each heading reflect this taxonomy, as do the species counts found in each family account. Introduced and accidental species are included in the total counts for Palau.

The following tags have been used to highlight several categories. The commonly occurring native species do not fall into any of these categories.

(A) Accidental - a species that rarely or accidentally occurs in Palau
(E) Endemic - a species endemic to Palau
(I) Introduced - a species introduced to Palau as a consequence, direct or indirect, of human actions
(Ex) Extirpated - a species that no longer occurs in Palau although populations exist elsewhere

Ducks, geese, and waterfowl
Order: AnseriformesFamily: Anatidae

Anatidae includes the ducks and most duck-like waterfowl, such as geese and swans. These birds are adapted to an aquatic existence with webbed feet, flattened bills, and feathers that are excellent at shedding water due to an oily coating.

Garganey, Spatula querquedula
Eurasian wigeon, Mareca penelope
Pacific black duck, Anas superciliosa
Northern pintail, Anas acuta
Green-winged teal, Anas crecca
Common pochard, Aythya ferina (A)
Tufted duck, Aythya fuligula

Megapodes
Order: GalliformesFamily: Megapodiidae

The Megapodiidae are stocky, medium-large chicken-like birds with small heads and large feet. All but the malleefowl occupy jungle habitats and most have brown or black colouring.

Micronesian scrubfowl, Megapodius laperouse

Pheasants, grouse, and allies
Order: GalliformesFamily: Phasianidae

The Phasianidae are a family of terrestrial birds which consists of quails, partridges, snowcocks, francolins, spurfowls, tragopans, monals, pheasants, peafowls and jungle fowls. In general, they are plump (although they vary in size) and have broad, relatively short wings.

Red junglefowl, Gallus gallus (I)

Pigeons and doves

Order: ColumbiformesFamily: Columbidae

Pigeons and doves are stout-bodied birds with short necks and short slender bills with a fleshy cere.

Palau ground dove, Alopecoenas canifrons (E)
Nicobar pigeon, Caloenas nicobarica
Palau fruit-dove, Ptilinopus pelewensis (E)
Micronesian imperial-pigeon, Ducula oceanica

Cuckoos
Order: CuculiformesFamily: Cuculidae

The family Cuculidae includes cuckoos, roadrunners and anis. These birds are of variable size with slender bodies, long tails and strong legs. The Old World cuckoos are brood parasites.

Chestnut-winged cuckoo, Clamator coromandus (A)
Long-tailed koel, Urodynamis taitensis (A)
Channel-billed cuckoo, Scythrops novaehollandiae (A)
Brush cuckoo, Cacomantis variolosus (A)
Northern hawk-cuckoo, Hierococcyx hyperythrus (A)
Hodgson's hawk-cuckoo, Hierococcyx nisicolor (A)
Common cuckoo, Cuculus canorus (A)
Oriental cuckoo, Cuculus optatus

Nightjars and allies
Order: CaprimulgiformesFamily: Caprimulgidae

Nightjars are medium-sized nocturnal birds that usually nest on the ground. They have long wings, short legs and very short bills. Most have small feet, of little use for walking, and long pointed wings. Their soft plumage is camouflaged to resemble bark or leaves.

Gray nightjar, Caprimulgus jotaka
Palau nightjar, Caprimulgus phalaena (E)

Swifts
Order: CaprimulgiformesFamily: Apodidae

Swifts are small birds which spend the majority of their lives flying. These birds have very short legs and never settle voluntarily on the ground, perching instead only on vertical surfaces. Many swifts have long swept-back wings which resemble a crescent or boomerang.

White-throated needletail, Hirundapus caudacutus (A)
Palau swiftlet, Aerodramus pelewensis (E)
Pacific swift, Apus pacificus (A)

Rails, gallinules, and coots
Order: GruiformesFamily: Rallidae

Rallidae is a large family of small to medium-sized birds which includes the rails, crakes, coots and gallinules. Typically they inhabit dense vegetation in damp environments near lakes, swamps or rivers. In general they are shy and secretive birds, making them difficult to observe. Most species have strong legs and long toes which are well adapted to soft uneven surfaces. They tend to have short, rounded wings and to be weak fliers.

Buff-banded rail, Gallirallus philippensis
Eurasian moorhen, Gallinula chloropus
Eurasian coot, Fulica atra (A)
Black-backed swamphen, Porphyrio indicus
Australasian swamphen, Porphyrio melanotus
White-breasted waterhen, Amaurornis phoenicurus (A)
Pale-vented bush-hen, Amaurornis moluccana (A)
White-browed crake, Poliolimnas cinereus
Red-legged crake, Rallina fasciata (A)
Slaty-legged crake, Rallina eurizonoides

Stilts and avocets
Order: CharadriiformesFamily: Recurvirostridae

Recurvirostridae is a family of large wading birds, which includes the avocets and stilts. The avocets have long legs and long up-curved bills. The stilts have extremely long legs and long, thin, straight bills.

Black-winged stilt, Himantopus himantopus
Pied stilt, Himantopus leucocephalus (A)
Black-necked stilt, Himantopus mexicanus

Plovers and lapwings
Order: CharadriiformesFamily: Charadriidae

The family Charadriidae includes the plovers, dotterels and lapwings. They are small to medium-sized birds with compact bodies, short, thick necks and long, usually pointed, wings. They are found in open country worldwide, mostly in habitats near water.

Black-bellied plover, Pluvialis squatarola
Pacific golden-plover, Pluvialis fulva
Lesser sand-plover, Charadrius mongolus
Greater sand-plover, Charadrius leschenaultii
Kentish plover, Charadrius alexandrinus
Common ringed plover, Charadrius hiaticula
Little ringed plover, Charadrius dubius
Oriental plover, Charadrius veredus (A)
Red-kneed dotterel, Erythrogonys cinctus (A)

Sandpipers and allies
Order: CharadriiformesFamily: Scolopacidae

Scolopacidae is a large diverse family of small to medium-sized shorebirds including the sandpipers, curlews, godwits, shanks, tattlers, woodcocks, snipes, dowitchers and phalaropes. The majority of these species eat small invertebrates picked out of the mud or soil. Variation in length of legs and bills enables multiple species to feed in the same habitat, particularly on the coast, without direct competition for food.

Whimbrel, Numenius phaeopus
Little curlew, Numenius minutus (A)
Far Eastern curlew, Numenius madagascariensis
Eurasian curlew, Numenius arquata (A)
Bar-tailed godwit, Limosa lapponica
Black-tailed godwit, Limosa limosa
Ruddy turnstone, Arenaria interpres
Great knot, Calidris tenuirostris
Red knot, Calidris canutus (A)
Ruff, Calidris pugnax
Broad-billed sandpiper, Calidris falcinellus (A)
Sharp-tailed sandpiper, Calidris acuminata
Curlew sandpiper, Calidris ferruginea
Temminck's stint, Calidris temminckii (A)
Long-toed stint, Calidris subminuta
Red-necked stint, Calidris ruficollis
Sanderling, Calidris alba
Dunlin, Calidris alpina
Little stint, Calidris minuta (A)
Pectoral sandpiper, Calidris melanotos
Asian dowitcher, Limnodromus semipalmatus (A)
Common snipe, Gallinago gallinago (A)
Swinhoe's snipe, Gallinago megala
Terek sandpiper, Xenus cinereus
Red-necked phalarope, Phalaropus lobatus (A)
Common sandpiper, Actitis hypoleucos
Green sandpiper, Tringa ochropus (A)
Gray-tailed tattler, Tringa brevipes
Wandering tattler, Tringa incana
Common greenshank, Tringa nebularia
Marsh sandpiper, Tringa stagnatilis
Wood sandpiper, Tringa glareola
Common redshank, Tringa totanus

Pratincoles and coursers
Order: CharadriiformesFamily: Glareolidae

Glareolidae is a family of wading birds comprising the pratincoles, which have short legs, long pointed wings and long forked tails, and the coursers, which have long legs, short wings and long pointed bills which curve downwards.

Oriental pratincole, Glareola maldivarum

Skuas and jaegers
Order: CharadriiformesFamily: Stercorariidae

The family Stercorariidae are, in general, medium to large birds, typically with grey or brown plumage, often with white markings on the wings. They nest on the ground in temperate and arctic regions and are long-distance migrants.

Pomarine jaeger, Stercorarius pomarinus (A)
Long-tailed jaeger, Stercorarius longicaudus

Gulls, terns, and skimmers
Order: CharadriiformesFamily: Laridae

Laridae is a family of medium to large seabirds, the gulls, terns, and skimmers. Gulls are typically grey or white, often with black markings on the head or wings. They have stout, longish bills and webbed feet. Terns are a group of generally medium to large seabirds typically with grey or white plumage, often with black markings on the head. Most terns hunt fish by diving but some pick insects off the surface of fresh water. Terns are generally long-lived birds, with several species known to live in excess of 30 years.

Black-headed gull, Chroicocephalus ridibundus
Brown noddy, Anous stolidus
Black noddy, Anous minutus
White tern, Gygis alba
Sooty tern, Onychoprion fuscatus
Gray-backed tern, Onychoprion lunatus
Bridled tern, Onychoprion anaethetus
Little tern, Sternula albifrons
Gull-billed tern, Gelochelidon nilotica (A)
White-winged tern, Chlidonias leucopterus
Whiskered tern, Chlidonias hybrida
Black-naped tern, Sterna sumatrana
Common tern, Sterna hirundo
Great crested tern, Thalasseus bergii

Tropicbirds
Order: PhaethontiformesFamily: Phaethontidae

Tropicbirds are slender white birds of tropical oceans, with exceptionally long central tail feathers. Their heads and long wings have black markings.

White-tailed tropicbird, Phaethon lepturus
Red-tailed tropicbird, Phaethon rubricauda

Northern storm-petrels
Order: ProcellariiformesFamily: Hydrobatidae

The northern storm-petrels are relatives of the petrels and are the smallest seabirds. They feed on planktonic crustaceans and small fish picked from the surface, typically while hovering. The flight is fluttering and sometimes bat-like.

Matsudaira's storm-petrel, Hydrobates matsudairae

Shearwaters and petrels
Order: ProcellariiformesFamily: Procellariidae

The procellariids are the main group of medium-sized "true petrels", characterised by united nostrils with medium septum and a long outer functional primary.

Providence petrel, Pterodroma solandri
Bulwer's petrel, Bulweria bulwerii 
Streaked shearwater, Calonectris leucomelas
Wedge-tailed shearwater, Ardenna pacificus
Tropical shearwater, Puffinus bailloni

Frigatebirds
Order: SuliformesFamily: Fregatidae

Frigatebirds are large seabirds usually found over tropical oceans. They are large, black and white or completely black, with long wings and deeply forked tails. The males have coloured inflatable throat pouches. They do not swim or walk and cannot take off from a flat surface. Having the largest wingspan-to-body-weight ratio of any bird, they are essentially aerial, able to stay aloft for more than a week.

Lesser frigatebird, Fregata ariel
Great frigatebird, Fregata minor

Boobies and gannets
Order: SuliformesFamily: Sulidae

The sulids comprise the gannets and boobies. Both groups are medium to large coastal seabirds that plunge-dive for fish.

Masked booby, Sula dactylatra
Brown booby, Sula leucogaster
Red-footed booby, Sula sula

Cormorants and shags
Order: SuliformesFamily: Phalacrocoracidae

Phalacrocoracidae is a family of medium to large coastal, fish-eating seabirds that includes cormorants and shags. Plumage colouration varies, with the majority having mainly dark plumage, some species being black-and-white and a few being colourful.

Little pied cormorant, Microcarbo melanoleucos
Great cormorant, Phalacrocorax carbo (A)
Little black cormorant, Phalacrocorax sulcirostris (A)

Pelicans
Order: PelecaniformesFamily: Pelecanidae

Pelicans are large water birds with a distinctive pouch under their beak. As with other members of the order Pelecaniformes, they have webbed feet with four toes.

Australian pelican, Pelecanus conspicillatus (A)

Herons, egrets, and bitterns
Order: PelecaniformesFamily: Ardeidae

The family Ardeidae contains the bitterns, herons, and egrets. Herons and egrets are medium to large wading birds with long necks and legs. Bitterns tend to be shorter necked and more wary. Members of Ardeidae fly with their necks retracted, unlike other long-necked birds such as storks, ibises and spoonbills.

Yellow bittern, Ixobrychus sinensis
Schrenck's bittern, Ixobrychus eurhythmus (A)
Gray heron, Ardea cinerea (A)
Great egret, Ardea alba
Intermediate egret, Ardea intermedia
Little egret, Egretta garzetta
Pacific reef-heron, Egretta sacra
Cattle egret, Bubulcus ibis
Chinese pond-heron, Ardeola bacchus (A)
Striated heron, Butorides striata
Black-crowned night-heron, Nycticorax nycticorax
Nankeen night-heron, Nycticorax caledonicus
Japanese night-heron, Gorsachius goisagi (A)
Malayan night-heron, Gorsachius melanolophus (A)

Ibises and spoonbills
Order: PelecaniformesFamily: Threskiornithidae

Threskiornithidae is a family of large terrestrial and wading birds which includes the ibises and spoonbills. They have long, broad wings with 11 primary and about 20 secondary feathers. They are strong fliers and despite their size and weight, very capable soarers.
  
Glossy ibis, Plegadis falcinellus (A)
Black-faced spoonbill, Platalea minor (A)

Osprey
Order: AccipitriformesFamily: Pandionidae

The family Pandionidae contains only one species, the osprey. The osprey is a medium-large raptor which is a specialist fish-eater with a worldwide distribution.

Osprey, Pandion haliaetus

Hawks, eagles, and kites
Order: AccipitriformesFamily: Accipitridae

Accipitridae is a family of birds of prey, which includes hawks, eagles, kites, harriers and Old World vultures. These birds have powerful hooked beaks for tearing flesh from their prey, strong legs, powerful talons and keen eyesight.

Gray-faced buzzard, Butastur indicus (A)
Chinese sparrowhawk, Accipiter soloensis
Black kite, Milvus migrans 
Brahminy kite, Haliastur indus (A)

Owls
Order: StrigiformesFamily: Strigidae

The typical owls are small to large solitary nocturnal birds of prey. They have large forward-facing eyes and ears, a hawk-like beak and a conspicuous circle of feathers around each eye called a facial disk.

Palau owl, Pyrroglaux podarginus (E)

Kingfishers
Order: CoraciiformesFamily: Alcedinidae

Kingfishers are medium-sized birds with large heads, long pointed bills, short legs and stubby tails.

Common kingfisher, Alcedo atthis (A)
Ruddy kingfisher, Halcyon coromanda (A)
Palau kingfisher, Todirhamphus pelewensis (E)
Sacred kingfisher, Todirhamphus sanctus (A)
Collared kingfisher, Todirhamphus chloris

Bee-eaters
Order: CoraciiformesFamily: Meropidae

The bee-eaters are a group of near passerine birds in the family Meropidae. Most species are found in Africa but others occur in southern Europe, Madagascar, Australia and New Guinea. They are characterised by richly coloured plumage, slender bodies and usually elongated central tail feathers. All are colourful and have long downturned bills and pointed wings, which give them a swallow-like appearance when seen from afar.

Rainbow bee-eater, Merops ornatus (A)

Rollers
Order: CoraciiformesFamily: Coraciidae

Rollers resemble crows in size and build, but are more closely related to the kingfishers and bee-eaters. They share the colourful appearance of those groups with blues and browns predominating. The two inner front toes are connected, but the outer toe is not.

Dollarbird, Eurystomus orientalis

Falcons and caracaras
Order: FalconiformesFamily: Falconidae

Falconidae is a family of diurnal birds of prey. They differ from hawks, eagles and kites in that they kill with their beaks instead of their talons.

Peregrine falcon, Falco peregrinus

Cockatoos
Order: PsittaciformesFamily: Cacatuidae

The cockatoos share many features with other parrots including the characteristic curved beak shape and a zygodactyl foot, with two forward toes and two backwards toes. They differ, however in a number of characteristics, including the often spectacular movable headcrest. .

Sulphur-crested cockatoo, Cacatua galerita (I)

Old World parrots
Order: PsittaciformesFamily: Psittaculidae

Characteristic features of parrots include a strong curved bill, an upright stance, strong legs, and clawed zygodactyl feet. Many parrots are vividly coloured, and some are multi-coloured. Old World parrots are found from Africa east across south and southeast Asia and Oceania to Australia and New Zealand.

Eclectus parrot, Eclectus roratus (I)

Honeyeaters
Order: PasseriformesFamily: Meliphagidae

The honeyeaters are a large and diverse family of small to medium-sized birds most common in Australia and New Guinea. They are nectar feeders and closely resemble other nectar-feeding passerines.

Micronesian myzomela, Myzomela rubratra

Cuckooshrikes
Order: PasseriformesFamily: Campephagidae

The cuckooshrikes are small to medium-sized passerine birds. They are predominantly greyish with white and black, although some species are brightly coloured.

Common cicadabird, Edolisoma tenuirostre

Whistlers and allies

Order: PasseriformesFamily: Pachycephalidae

The family Pachycephalidae includes the whistlers, shrikethrushes, and some of the pitohuis.

Morningbird, Pachycephala tenebrosa (E)

Woodswallows, bellmagpies, and allies
Order: PasseriformesFamily: Artamidae

The woodswallows are soft-plumaged, somber-coloured passerine birds. They are smooth, agile flyers with moderately large, semi-triangular wings.

White-breasted woodswallow, Artamus leucorynchus

Fantails

Order: PasseriformesFamily: Rhipiduridae

The fantails are small insectivorous birds which are specialist aerial feeders.

Palau fantail, Rhipidura lepida (E)

Monarch flycatchers
Order: PasseriformesFamily: Monarchidae

The monarch flycatchers are small to medium-sized insectivorous passerines which hunt by flycatching.

Palau flycatcher, Myiagra erythrops (E)

Shrikes
Order: PasseriformesFamily: Laniidae

Shrikes are passerine birds known for their habit of catching other birds and small animals and impaling the uneaten portions of their bodies on thorns. A typical shrike's beak is hooked, like a bird of prey.

Brown shrike, Lanius cristatus (A)

Reed warblers and allies
Order: PasseriformesFamily: Acrocephalidae

The members of this family are usually rather large for "warblers". Most are rather plain olivaceous brown above with much yellow to beige below. They are usually found in open woodland, reedbeds, or tall grass. The family occurs mostly in southern to western Eurasia and surroundings, but it also ranges far into the Pacific, with some species in Africa.

Oriental reed warbler, Acrocephalus orientalis (A)

Grassbirds and allies
Order: PasseriformesFamily: Locustellidae

Locustellidae are a family of small insectivorous songbirds found mainly in Eurasia, Africa, and the Australian region. They are smallish birds with tails that are usually long and pointed, and tend to be drab brownish or buffy all over.

Lanceolated warbler, Locustella lanceolata (A)

Swallows
Order: PasseriformesFamily: Hirundinidae

The family Hirundinidae is adapted to aerial feeding. They have a slender streamlined body, long pointed wings and a short bill with a wide gape. The feet are adapted to perching rather than walking, and the front toes are partially joined at the base.

Bank swallow, Riparia riparia (A)
Barn swallow, Hirundo rustica
Red-rumped swallow, Cecropis daurica (A)
Asian house-martin, Delichon dasypus (A)

Bush warblers and allies
Order: PasseriformesFamily: Scotocercidae

The members of this family are found throughout Africa, Asia, and Polynesia. Their taxonomy is in flux, and some authorities place some genera in other families.

Palau bush warbler, Horornis annae (E)

White-eyes, yuhinas, and allies
Order: PasseriformesFamily: Zosteropidae

The white-eyes are small and mostly undistinguished, their plumage above being generally some dull colour like greenish-olive, but some species have a white or bright yellow throat, breast or lower parts, and several have buff flanks. As their name suggests, many species have a white ring around each eye.

Giant white-eye, Megazosterops palauensis (E)
Caroline Islands white-eye, Zosterops semperi
Dusky white-eye, Zosterops finschii (E)

Starlings
Order: PasseriformesFamily: Sturnidae

Starlings are small to medium-sized passerine birds. Their flight is strong and direct and they are very gregarious. Their preferred habitat is fairly open country. They eat insects and fruit. Plumage is typically dark with a metallic sheen.

Micronesian starling, Aplonis opaca
Chestnut-cheeked starling, Agropsar philippensis (A)

Thrushes and allies
Order: PasseriformesFamily: Turdidae

The thrushes are a group of passerine birds that occur mainly in the Old World. They are plump, soft plumaged, small to medium-sized insectivores or sometimes omnivores, often feeding on the ground. Many have attractive songs.

Scaly thrush, Zoothera dauma (A)
Eyebrowed thrush, Turdus obscurus (A)

Old World flycatchers
Order: PasseriformesFamily: Muscicapidae

Old World flycatchers are a large group of small passerine birds native to the Old World. They are mainly small arboreal insectivores. The appearance of these birds is highly varied, but they mostly have weak songs and harsh calls.

Gray-streaked flycatcher, Muscicapa griseisticta
Blue-and-white flycatcher, Cyanoptila cyanomelana (A)
Siberian rubythroat, Calliope calliope (A)
Narcissus flycatcher, Ficedula narcissina (A)
Blue rock-thrush, Monticola solitarius (A)
Isabelline wheatear, Oenanthe isabellina (A)

Waxbills and allies
Order: PasseriformesFamily: Estrildidae

The estrildid finches are small passerine birds of the Old World tropics and Australasia. They are gregarious and often colonial seed eaters with short thick but pointed bills. They are all similar in structure and habits, but have wide variation in plumage colours and patterns.

Blue-faced parrotfinch, Erythrura trichroa
Scaly-breasted munia, Lonchura punctulata (Ex)
Chestnut munia, Lonchura atricapilla (I)

Old World sparrows
Order: PasseriformesFamily: Passeridae

Old World sparrows are small passerine birds. In general, sparrows tend to be small, plump, brown or grey birds with short tails and short powerful beaks. Sparrows are seed eaters, but they also consume small insects.

Eurasian tree sparrow, Passer montanus (I)

Wagtails and pipits
Order: PasseriformesFamily: Motacillidae

Motacillidae is a family of small passerine birds with medium to long tails. They include the wagtails, longclaws and pipits. They are slender, ground feeding insectivores of open country.

Gray wagtail, Motacilla cinerea (A)
Eastern yellow wagtail, Motacilla tschutschensis
White wagtail, Motacilla alba (A)
Blyth's pipit, Anthus godlewskii (A)
Olive-backed pipit, Anthus hodgsoni (A)
Red-throated pipit, Anthus cervinus (A)

Old World buntings
Order: PasseriformesFamily: Emberizidae

The emberizids are a large family of passerine birds. They are seed-eating birds with distinctively shaped bills. Many emberizid species have distinctive head patterns.

Black-headed bunting, Emberiza melanocephala (A)
Little bunting, Emberiza pusilla (A)

See also
List of birds
Lists of birds by region

References

Palau
'
birds